Yellow Sticky Notes is a 2007 animated short film by Canadian artist Jeff Chiba Stearns. The film uses a series of sticky note papers to tell the events that happened to the filmmaker and the rest of the world during nine years.

Awards
2009 Prix du Public Labo (Audience Award Lab Competition): 31st Clermont-Ferrand Short Film Festival
2009 Golden Pencil Award for Best 2d Animation: 2d or not 2d Animation Festival
2009 Best Animated Short Film: Beloit International Film Festival
2008 Best Animated Short Film:  Calgary International Film Festival
2008 Best Animated Short Subject : Canadian Awards for the Electronic & Animated Arts
2008 Platinum Remi Award Winner for Best Animated (Classic Cel Animation): 41st WorldFest - Houston Remi Awards
2008 Golden Sheaf Award for Best Animation and Nominated for Best Director Fiction: Yorkton Short Film and Video Festival
2008 Special Mention for Animated Short: Fantasia Film Festival
2007 Animasian Award for Best Animated Film: 11th Toronto Reel Asian International Film Festival

References

External links
 

2007 films
2007 short films
2007 animated films
2000s animated short films
Canadian animated short films
Films about Japanese Canadians
2000s English-language films
2000s Canadian films